Geoff Heslop (born 3 June 1947 in Northumberland, England) is an English record producer and musician.

Career
After training as a recording engineer, Geoff turned to record production, producing albums for the Rubber Records label in Newcastle upon Tyne.
He went on to set up the Black Crow Records label, the Coquetdale Music Publishing company (with Kathryn Tickell) and Redesdale Studios (with singer Dick Gaughan.
In the 1990s he put together a 2nd publishing company with his songwriter wife Brenda Heslop named Ribbon Road Music and issued 5 albums.
He now owns and runs Shipyard Studios with his daughter Jill and produces music by himself and others on their Shipyard label.

Records produced by Geoff Heslop

1970s
1972
 Don't Panic (Pete Scott)
 His Round (Tony Capstick and Hedgehog Pie)
1973
Very Good Time (Derek Brimstone)
1974
Life of a Man (The Buskers)
Punch and Judy Man (Tony Capstick)
There Was This Bloke (Mike Harding, Tony Capstick, Bill Barclay and Derek Brimstone)
1975
Mrs 'Ardin's Kid (Mike Harding)
1976
Songs and Buttered Haycocks (Dave Burland)
The Rochdale Cowboy Rides Again (Mike Harding)
Shuffleboat River Farewell (Derek Brimstone)
Broken-down Gentlemen (John Leonard and John Squire)
5 Hand Reel (Five Hand Reel)
Jimmy the Moonlight (Pete Scott)
1977
Alba (Alba)
Mike Harding's Back (Mike Harding)
Tony Capstick Does a Turn (Tony Capstick)
Out of the Brown (Mike Elliott)
1978
Just Act Normal (Hedgehog Pie)
The Traveller (Allan Taylor
Songs of Ewan MacColl (Dick Gaughan, Dave Burland and Tony Capstick)
Nowt So Good'll Pass (Bob Fox and Stu Luckley)
On Two Levels (Sean McGuire and Josephine Keegan)
1979
Kingdom (Dando Shaft)
You Can't Fool the Fat Man (Dave Burland)
Up the Town (The Buskers, Sean McGuire and Winter's Armoury)

1980s
1980
Roll on the Day (Allan Taylor)
Port of Call (Tom McConville and Kieran Halpin)
1981
The Champion String Band (The Champion String Band)
1982
At Last It's (Mike Elliott)
The Streets of Everywhere (Tom McConville and Kieran Halpin)
Wish We Never Had Parted (Bob Fox and Stu Luckley)
Joe Hutton of Coquetdale (Joe Hutton)
1983
Double Trouble (Maxie and Mitch)
Circle Round Again (Allan Taylor)
Harthope Burn (Joe Hutton, Will Atkinson and Willy Taylor)
On the Other Side (Alan Hull) (with Mickey Sweeney)
1984
Under the Rain (Rab Noakes)
1985
Shake Loose the Border (Chuck Fleming and Gerry Kaley)
1986
Borderlands (Kathryn Tickell)
From Sewingshields to Glendale (Kathryn Tickell, Alistair Anderson, Joe Hutton, Willy Taylor, Will Atkinson, Mike Tickell, Allan Wood, The John Dagg Band)
1987
The Grand Chain (Alistair Anderson)
Mouthorgan (Will Atkinson) (with Alistair Anderson)
1988
Leather Launderette (Bert Jansch and Rod Clements)
Another Little Adventure (Alan Hull)
Common Ground (Kathryn Tickell)

1990s
1990
Hootz! (Simon Thoumire and Ian Carr)
1991
Syncopace (Syncopace)
The Kathryn Tickell Band (The Kathryn Tickell Band)
Warksburn (Mike Tickell) (with Kathryn Tickell)
Blue Skies, Dark Nights (Roly Johnson)
The Border Piper (Joe and Hannah Hutton)
Jane of Biddlestone (Adrian D. Schofield)
Frisco Bound (Ray Stubbs)
Put Your Money Where Your Mouth Is (Ray Stubbs R and B All Stars)
1992
Signs (The Kathryn Tickell Band)
Welcome to the Dene (Willy Taylor)
A Difficult Fish (Johnny Handle)
1993
The Music of My Heart (Ribbon Road)
Waltzes for Playboys (Simon Thoumire Three)
The Mortgaged Heart (Ribbon Road)
1994
Opus Blue (Catriona MacDonald and Ian Lowthian)
The Moving Cloud (Ribbon Road)

2000s
2001
The Tender Coming (Ribbon Road)
2008
Golden Bells (Brenda Heslop and Ribbon Road)
2009
As the Stories Burn (Martin Heslop)
"Speaking Out" (Mission Shift)
It's a Silk Cut World (Mission Shift)
2010
It Couldn't Last (Ribbon Road)

References

Further reading
 'Standing on the Shoulders of Giants', article in issue 62 of The Living Tradition Magazine, May/June 2007.
 'Selling Coals to Newcastle' by Judith Murphy, published by North East England History Institute 2008
 'The Mocking Horse' by Alan Hull, illustrated by Geoff Heslop
 'Dazzling Stranger, Bert Jansch and the British Folk and Blues revival' by Colin Harper, published by Bloomsbury Publishing, London 2000

External links
 Geoff Heslop
 Ribbon Road
 Mission Shift
 Black Crow Records
 RubberRecords

1947 births
Living people
English record producers
People from Corbridge
Musicians from Northumberland